The Merry Duel (Czech: Veselý souboj) is a Czech comedy film. It was released in 1950.

External links
 

1950 films
1950 comedy films
Czechoslovak comedy films
Czechoslovak black-and-white films
1950s Czech films